James Allen Saul (born November 24, 1939, at Bristol, Virginia) is a retired American catcher, manager and coach in minor league baseball. The  season marked Saul's 50th season in professional baseball, all but three of them at the minor-league level. In Major League Baseball, Saul coached for three seasons, with the Chicago Cubs (1975–76) and Oakland Athletics.

Jim Saul attended East Tennessee State University. As a player, he threw right-handed, batted left-handed, stood 6'3" (190.5 cm) tall and weighed 210 pounds (95 kg). His catching career consisted of 14 seasons (1959–72) in the farm systems of the St. Louis Cardinals, Cincinnati Reds, Cubs, Cleveland Indians and California Angels. He was a journeyman who played for 19 different clubs over that span.

Through , he managed for 22 seasons in the Angels, Cubs, New York Yankees and Atlanta Braves organizations, including five seasons at the Double-A level. Saul's teams won 1,014 games and lost 1,090 (.482).

Saul began coaching for Rookie-level farm teams in 2005. From 2007 to 2009, he was a coach for the Bluefield Orioles, then Baltimore's affiliate in the Appalachian League.

References
 Douchant, Mike, and Marcin, Joe, eds. The Official 1976 Baseball Register.  St. Louis: The Sporting News, 1976.

External links

Coach's page from Retrosheet

1939 births
Living people
Atlanta Crackers players
Baseball coaches from Virginia
Baseball players from Virginia
Charleston Marlins players
Chicago Cubs coaches
Columbus Jets players
Dallas–Fort Worth Spurs players
Daytona Beach Islanders players
East Tennessee State University alumni
Eugene Emeralds managers
Hawaii Islanders players
Jacksonville Suns players
Keokuk Cardinals players
Lancaster Red Roses players
Major League Baseball bullpen coaches
Major League Baseball third base coaches
Minor league baseball coaches
Oakland Athletics coaches
Quincy Cubs players
People from Bristol, Virginia
Portland Beavers players
San Antonio Missions players
San Diego Padres (minor league) players
Tacoma Cubs players
Tulsa Oilers (baseball) players
Wichita Aeros players
Wytheville Cardinals players